Magic is the first Japanese studio album by Exo-CBX, the sub-unit of the South Korean-Chinese boy group Exo. It was released on May 9, 2018 by Avex Trax and distributed by Avex Music Creative. The album contains eleven tracks, including the lead single "Horololo" and a solo track for each member.

The album debuted at the third spot of the Oricon Weekly Albums chart with 41,173 copies sold on its first week of release.

Background and release
After announcing their first arena tour in January 2018, Magical Circus, it was revealed later in March 2018 that the group would also be releasing their first Japanese studio album on May 9. And on April 11, 2018, the details of the album were released stating that the album will be released in six versions; The CD and DVD or Blu-ray 'CBX' versions consist of the CD and a DVD with music videos for "Ka-CHING!" and "Horololo", an off-shot movie and live clips. There are also four versions with only the CD with full group, Chen, Baekhyun, and Xiumin covers. On the same day, it was also revealed that the album will include three solo tracks, one for each member. On April 20, Avex released an album teaser featuring snippets of the tracklist.

The music video for title track "Horololo" was released on April 24, prior to the release of the album. On May 9, 2018, the album was released.

Live performance 
Exo-CBX performed the tracks of the album in their first concert tour Magical Circus in Japan.

Track listing

DVD
 "Ka-Ching!" and "Horololo" music videos
 Off Shot Movie (※初回盤のみ収録)
 Live Clip (※初回のみ収録)

Charts

Sales

Release history

References

2018 albums
Avex Trax albums
Japanese-language albums
J-pop albums
Exo-CBX albums